Nebria vseteckai is a species of ground beetle from Nebriinae subfamily that is endemic to Greece.

References

vseteckai
Beetles described in 1938
Beetles of Europe
Endemic fauna of Greece